The Batwa Memons are a group of Kathiawadi Memons originating from the town of Bantva, Kathiawar, a former district of the state of Gujarat in India.

History
Bantva Memons are known to be mercantile people and include in their ranks tycoons such as the Dawood family (Dawood Industries) and Nobel Peace prize nominee  Abdul Sattar Edhi. The Bantva Memons, who were a majority in the Bantva region, left India after Partition and settled in Pakistan.

In Pakistan
The majority of them migrated to Pakistan after independence in 1947 and settled in Karachi, Hyderabad and Sukkur, Sindh, Pakistan.  The Bantva Memons are very successful businessmen who, for example, are founders of corporations such as Dawood Industries.

References

Memon people
Memon
Muhajir communities
Social groups of Pakistan
Social groups of Gujarat
Muslim communities of Gujarat